V Train could refer to:
The V (New York City Subway service)
The V/Line,  a not for profit regional passenger train and coach service in Victoria, Australia
The V-Train (Korail)